Digital film festivals emerged in the mid- to late-1990s, to showcase artists and filmmakers utilizing the nascent tools of desktop digital filmmaking.

Digital films and animation are now commonly found in mainstream film festivals, but these events laid the groundwork for pioneering works in the area as useful nexus points for digital artists and debates on digital distribution and creation.

The earliest digital film festivals included the MiniDV Festival (now called The Digital Video Festival) in Los Angeles, Low Res (later to split into the DFilm and RESFest events), onedotzero, and Exploding Cinema (the International Film Festival Rotterdam digital cinema sidebar). Other digital film festivals include .Mov (Japan), Darklight (Ireland), Bifilm (Germany), MP4Fest at Silver Lake Film Festival (Los Angeles, CA), 0110 (India), Clone (Norway), as well as onedotzero's international network of events across 60 cities worldwide, among others.

These festivals stretch the traditional boundaries of "film festivals" by including hybrid works from internet art, web animation, computer and video gaming, streaming video, music video, etc.

In 2008, the Paso Digital Film Festival set new standards and for six years has moved between #1 and #3 on all of the major search engines when "digital film festivals" is searched. The event was held in November 2008, and was attended by Clint Eastwood and 20 people from his film company Malpaso including his Academy Award-winning editor Joel Cox. Also attending were Sir Nigel Sinclair, Cass Warner the granddaughter of Jack Warner, musicians Johnny Rivers, Ramblin' Jack Elliott, Kyle Eastwood (Clint's son), TV actors Gary Conway and Max Gail, Kevin Bacon and his band The Bacon Brothers. The festival included a day of 3-D with some of the early pioneers in 3-D from Los Angeles attending and showing independent 3D movies. Elements of the festival were streamed live online from the website.

In 2013, the Digital Media Festival in Silicon Valley set another standard with a full shift from the world of "film" to the new age of "digital media" and staged in Silicon Valley, California. It was attended by filmmakers from San Francisco and Los Angeles, including Cass Warner, from the Warner Brothers family, Len Dell'Amico, the long time music video producer known as "the Grateful Dead's Video Guy", the author and photographer Chris Felver, the author and Stanford University professor Fred Turner and the actor Max Gail.

List of digital film festivals
 Digital MediaFestival.com 2012 - 2014
 FFTG Awards
 MP4Fest at Silver Lake Film Festival - digital festival-within-a-festival
 Nodance Film Festival
 onedotzero
 Paso Digital Film Festival from 2008- to 2014
 RESFest
 Streaming Festival

See also
List of new media art festivals

References